Dominic Meier may refer to:

 Dominic Meier (ice hockey) (born 1976), Swiss ice hockey defenceman
 Dominic Meier (marksman) (born 1969), Swiss sport shooter